The 1967–68 season was one of the most successful seasons in Manchester United's history, as the team beat Benfica 4–1 in the final of the 1967–68 European Cup to become the first English team to win the competition. The team was led by manager Matt Busby. Despite the European Cup success, United finished second in the First Division, two points behind local rival Manchester City after losing the last game of the season against Sunderland.

The 1967–68 season was a breakout year for winger George Best, who led the team with 28 goals in the First Division and 32 goals overall, being voted European Footballer of the Year and FWA Footballer of the Year. Four other players scored double-digit goals during the campaign: Bobby Charlton (20), Brian Kidd (17), Denis Law (11), and young winger John Aston, Jr. (10).

FA Charity Shield

On 12 August 1967, United and Tottenham Hotspur kicked off the season, playing for the 1967 FA Charity Shield at Old Trafford. Bobby Charlton scored two goals for United, while Denis Law scored their third. The match finished at 3–3, which meant that the two clubs shared the Shield, each holding it for six months.

Football League First Division

FA Cup

European Cup

Squad statistics

References

External links
 Manchester United Season 1967/68 at StretfordEnd.co.uk

Manchester United F.C. seasons
Manchester United
UEFA Champions League-winning seasons